The American bullfrog (Lithobates catesbeianus), often simply known as the bullfrog in Canada and the United States, is a large true frog native to eastern North America. It typically inhabits large permanent water bodies such as swamps, ponds, and lakes. Bullfrogs can also be found in manmade habitats such as pools, koi ponds, canals, ditches and culverts. The bullfrog gets its name from the sound the male makes during the breeding season, which sounds similar to a bull bellowing. The bullfrog is large and is commonly eaten throughout its range, especially in the southern United States where they are plentiful.

Their presence as a food source has led to bullfrogs being distributed around the world outside of their native range. Bullfrogs have been introduced into the Western United States, South America, Western Europe, China, Japan, and southeast Asia. In these places they are invasive species due to their voracious appetite and the large number of eggs they produce, having a negative effect on native amphibians and other fauna. Bullfrogs are very skittish which makes capture difficult and so they often become established.

Other than for food, bullfrogs are also used for dissection in science classes. Albino bullfrogs are sometimes kept as pets, and bullfrog tadpoles are often sold at pond or fish stores.

Taxonomy
Some authorities use the scientific name, Lithobates catesbeiana, although others prefer Rana catesbeiana.

Genome
The nuclear genome (~5.8Gbp) of the North American bullfrog (Rana [Lithobates] catesbeiana) was published in 2017 and provides a resource for future Ranidae research.

Etymology
The specific name, catesbeiana (feminine) or catesbeianus (masculine), is in honor of English naturalist Mark Catesby.

Description

The dorsal (upper) surface of the bullfrog has an olive-green basal color, either plain or with mottling and banding of grayish brown. The ventral (under) surface is off-white blotched with yellow or gray. Often, a marked contrast in color is seen between the green upper lip and the pale lower lip. The teeth are tiny and are useful only in grasping. The eyes are prominent with brown irises and horizontal, almond-shaped pupils. The tympana (eardrums) are easily seen just behind the eyes and the dorsolateral folds of skin enclose them. The limbs are blotched or banded with gray. The fore legs are short and sturdy and the hind legs long. The front toes are not webbed, but the back toes have webbing between the digits with the exception of the fourth toe, which is unwebbed.

Bullfrogs are sexually dimorphic, with males being bigger than females and having yellow throats. Males have tympana larger than their eyes, whereas the tympana in females are about the same size as the eyes. The American bullfrog is the largest species of frog in North America.

Distribution

The bullfrog is native to eastern North America. Its natural range extends from the Atlantic Coast, north to Newfoundland, to as far west as Oklahoma and Kansas. It is not found on offshore islands near Cape Cod and is largely absent from Florida, Colorado, Nebraska, South Dakota, and Minnesota. It has been introduced into Nantucket island, Arizona, Utah, other parts of Colorado and Nebraska, Nevada, California, Oregon, Washington, and Hawaii. In these states, it is considered to be an invasive species and concern exists that it may outcompete native species of amphibians and upset the ecological balance. It is very common on the West Coast, especially in California, where it is believed to pose a threat to the California red-legged frog, and is considered to be a factor in the decline of that vulnerable species.

Other countries and regions into which the bullfrog has been introduced include the western provinces of Canada, Mexico, Cuba, the Dominican Republic, Jamaica, Italy, the Netherlands, Belgium, and France. It is also found in Argentina, Brazil, Uruguay, Venezuela, Colombia, China, South Korea and Japan. The reasons for introducing the bullfrog to these countries have included their intentional release, either to provide a source of food or as biological control agents, the escape of frogs from breeding establishments, and the escape or release of frogs kept as pets. Conservationists are concerned the bullfrog is relatively immune to the fungal infection chytridiomycosis and as it invades new territories, it may assist the spread of this lethal disease as an asymptomatic carrier to more susceptible native species of frog.

Breeding behavior
The bullfrog breeding season typically lasts two to three months. A study of bullfrogs in Michigan showed the males arriving at the breeding site in late May or early June, and remaining in the area into July. At least three different types of calls have been noted in male bullfrogs under different circumstances. These distinctive calls include territorial calls made as threats to other males, advertisement calls made to attract females, and encounter calls which precede combat.

The bullfrogs have a prolonged breeding season, with the males continuously engaging in sexual activity throughout. Males are present at the breeding pond for longer periods than females during the entire season, increasing their chances of multiple matings. The sex ratio is typically skewed toward males. Conversely, females have brief periods of sexual receptivity during the season. In one study, female sexual activity typically lasted for a single night and mating did not occur unless the females initiated the physical contact. Males only clasp females after they have indicated their willingness to mate. This finding refutes previous claims that a male frog will clasp any proximate female with no regard to whether the female has consented. Once a male finds a receptive female he will clasp onto her and undergo amplexus--reproductive position--by utilization of the males forelimbs. The enlargement forelimbs is a sexually dimorphic trait seen in the male bullfrog. One study investigating male and female bullfrog forelimbs muscles found males had significantly stronger muscles that could undergo longer durations of activity before the onset of fatigue. The significance of forelimb sexual dimorphism allow males to remain in amplexus with the female for longer durations increasing their chance at reproductive success in the highly competitive mating environment.  

These male and female behaviors cause male-to-male competition to be high within the bullfrog population and sexual selection for the females to be an intense process. Kentwood Wells postulated leks, territorial polygyny, and harems are the most likely classifications for the bullfrog mating system. Leks would be a valid description because males congregate to attract females, and the females arrive to the site for the purpose of copulation. In a 1980 study on bullfrogs in New Jersey, the mating system was classified as resource-defense polygyny. The males defended territories within the group and demonstrated typical physical forms of defense.

Choruses
Male bullfrogs aggregate into groups called choruses. The male chorus behavior is analogous to the lek formation of birds, mammals, and other vertebrates. Choruses are dynamic, forming and remaining associated for a few days, breaking down temporarily, and then forming again in a new area with a different group of males. Male movement has experimentally been noted to be dynamic. In the Michigan study, the choruses were described as "centers of attraction" in which their larger numbers enhanced the males' overall acoustical displays. This is more attractive to females and also attractive to other sexually active males. Choruses in this study were dynamic, constantly forming and breaking up. New choruses were formed in other areas of the site. Males moved around and were highly mobile within the choruses.

A review of multiple studies on bullfrogs and other anurans noted male behavior within the groups changes according to the population density of the leks. At higher population densities, leks are favored due to the difficulty in defending individual territories among a large population of males. This variance causes differences in how females choose their mates. When the male population density is low and males maintain clearer, more distinct territories, female choice is mostly determined by territory quality. When male population density is higher, females depend on other cues to select their mates. These cues include the males' positions within the chorus and differences in male display behaviors among other determinants. Social dominance within the choruses is established through challenges, threats, and other physical displays. Older males tend to acquire more central locations while younger males were restricted to the periphery.

Chorus tenure is the number of nights that a male participates in the breeding chorus. One study distinguishes between chorus tenure and dominant tenure. Dominant tenure is more strictly defined as the amount of time a male maintains a dominant status. Chorus tenure is restricted due to increased risk of predation, lost foraging opportunities, and higher energy consumption. Calling is postulated to be energetically costly to anurans in general. Energy is also expended through locomotion and aggressive interactions of male bullfrogs within the chorus.

Aggressive behavior
To establish social dominance within choruses, bullfrogs demonstrate various forms of aggression, especially through visual displays. Posture is a key factor in establishing social position and threatening challengers. Territorial males have inflated postures while non-territorial males remain in the water with only their heads showing. For dominant (territorial) males, their elevated posture reveals their yellow-colored throats. When two dominant males encounter each other, they engage in a wrestling bout. The males have their venters clasped, each individual in an erect position rising to well above water level. The New Jersey study noted the males would approach each other to within a few centimeters and then tilt back their heads, displaying their brilliantly colored gular sacs. The gular is dichromatic in bullfrogs, with dominant and fitter males displaying yellow gulars. The New Jersey study also reported low posture with only the head exposed above the water surface was typical of subordinate, or non-territorial males, and females. High posture was demonstrated by territorial males, which floated on the surface of the water with their lungs inflated, displaying their yellow gulars. Males optimize their reproductive fitness in a number of ways. Early arrival at the breeding site, prolonged breeding with continuous sexual activity throughout the season, ownership of a centrally located territory within the chorus, and successful movement between the dynamically changing choruses are all common ways for males to maintain dominant, or territorial, status within the chorus. Older males have greater success in all of these areas than younger males. Some of the males display a more inferior role, termed by many researchers as the silent male status. These silent males adopt a submissive posture, sit near resident males and make no attempt to displace them. The silent males do not attempt to intercept females but are waiting for the territories to become vacant. This has also been called the alternate or satellite male strategy.

Growth and development

After selecting a male, the female deposits eggs in his territory. During the mating grasp, or amplexus, the male rides on top of the female, grasping her just behind her fore limbs. The female chooses a site in shallow water among vegetation, and lays a batch of up to 20,000 eggs, and the male simultaneously releases sperm, resulting in external fertilization. If the water temperature rises above

, developmental abnormalities occur, and if it falls below , normal development ceases. Newly hatched tadpoles show a preference for living in shallow water on fine gravel bottoms. This may reflect a lesser number of predators in these locations. As they grow, they tend to move into deeper water. The tadpoles initially have three pairs of external gills and several rows of labial teeth. They pump water through their gills by movements of the floor of their mouths, trapping bacteria, single-celled algae, protozoans, pollen grains, and other small particles on mucus in a filtration organ in their pharynges. As they grow, they begin to ingest larger particles and use their teeth for rasping. They have downward-facing mouths, deep bodies, and tails with broad dorsal and ventral fins.

Time to metamorphosis ranges from a few months in the southern part of the range to 3 years in the north, where the colder water slows development. Maximum lifespan in the wild is estimated to be 8 to 10 years, but one frog lived for almost 16 years in captivity.

Feeding 
Bullfrogs are voracious, opportunistic, ambush predators that prey on any small animal they can overpower and stuff down their throats. Bullfrog stomachs have been found to contain rodents, small lizards and snakes, other frogs and toads, amphibians, crayfish, other crustaceans, small birds, scorpions, tarantulas and bats, as well as the many types of invertebrates, such as snails, worms and insects, which are the usual food of ranid frogs. These studies revealed the bullfrog's diet to be unique among North American ranids in the inclusion of a large percentage of aquatic animals, such as fish, tadpoles, ram's horn snails, and dytiscid beetles, as well as the aquatic eggs of fish, frogs, insects, or salamanders. Bullfrogs are able to capture large, strong prey because of the powerful grip of their jaws after the initial ranid tongue strike. The bullfrog is able to make allowance for light refraction at the water-air interface by striking at a position posterior to the target's perceived location. The comparative ability of bullfrogs to capture submerged prey, compared to that of the green frog, leopard frog, and wood frog (L. clamitans, L. pipiens, and L. sylvaticus, respectively) was also demonstrated in laboratory experiments.

Prey motion elicits feeding behavior. First, if necessary, the frog performs a single, orienting bodily rotation ending with the frog aimed towards the prey, followed by approaching leaps, if necessary. Once within striking distance, the bullfrog begins its feeding strike, which consists of a ballistic lunge (eyes closed as during all leaps) that ends with the mouth opening. At this stage, the fleshy, mucus-coated tongue is extended towards the prey, often engulfing it, while the jaws continue their forward travel to close (bite) just as the tongue is retracted. Large prey that do not fit entirely into the mouth are stuffed in with the hands. In laboratory observations, bullfrogs taking mice usually swam underwater with prey in mouth, apparently with the advantageous result of altering the mouse's defense from counter-attack to struggling for air. Asphyxiation is the most likely cause of death of warm-blooded prey.

Biomechanical background of tongue projection 
The speed of a bullfrog's tongue strike is much faster than it should be if muscles were the only force behind it. Similar to the tension on a slingshot pulled all the way back, when the frog's mouth is closed, tension is put into the elastic tissues of the tongue, and also into the elastic tendons of the lower jaw. When the frog attacks prey, opening its mouth is like letting go of the slingshot; the elastic force stored up in both the tongue and the jaw are combined to shoot the tip of the tongue toward the prey much faster than the prey's ability to see the strike and evade capture, completing the strike and retrieval in approximately 0.07 seconds. Another benefit of this elastic-force based attack is that it is not dependent on background temperature. A frog with a cold body temperature has muscles that move more slowly, but it can still attack prey with the same speed as if its body was warm.

Ballistic tongue projection of the related leopard frog is possible due to the presence of elastic structures that allow storage and subsequent release of elastic recoil energy. This accounts for the tongue projecting with higher power output than would develop by muscular action alone. Also, such mechanism relieves the tongue's musculature from physiological constraints such as limited peak power output - mechanical efficiency and thermal dependence by uncoupling the activation of the depressor mandibulae's contractile units from actual muscular movement. In other words, the kinematic parameters developed by contribution of the elastic structures differ from those developed by muscular projection, accounting for the difference in velocity, power output, and thermal dependence.

Ecology

Bullfrogs are an important item of prey to many birds (especially large herons), North American river otters (Lontra canadensis), predatory fish, and occasionally other amphibians. Predators of American bullfrogs once in their adult stages can range from  belted kingfishers (Megaceryle alcyon) to 1,100-pound (500 kg) American alligators (Alligator mississippiensis). The eggs and larvae are unpalatable to many salamanders and fish, but the high levels of activity of the tadpoles may make them more noticeable to a predator not deterred by their unpleasant taste. Humans hunt bullfrogs as game and consume their legs. Adult frogs try to escape by splashing and leaping into deep water. A trapped individual may squawk or emit a piercing scream, which may surprise the attacker sufficiently for the frog to escape. An attack on one bullfrog is likely to alert others in the vicinity to danger and they will all retreat into the safety of deeper water. Bullfrogs may be at least partially resistant to the venom of copperhead (Agkistrodon contortrix) and cottonmouth (Agkistrodon piscivorus) snakes, though these species are known natural predators of bullfrogs as are northern water snakes (Nerodia sipedon).

Considering the invasive nature of the L. catesbeianus, multiple traits within the species contribute to its competitive ability. The generalist diet of the American bullfrog allows for it to consume food in different environments. When observing the contents of American bullfrog stomachs, it was discovered that adult bullfrogs regularly consume predators of bullfrog young, including dragonfly nymphs, garter snakes, and giant water bugs. Thus, the ecological check on American bullfrog juveniles in invaded areas become less effective. L. catesbeianus seems to exhibit traits of immunity or resistance against the antipredator defenses of other organisms. Analysis of stomach contents from bullfrog populations in New Mexico show the regular consumption of wasps, with no conditioned avoidance due to the wasps stingers. Along the Colorado river, L. catesbeianus stomach contents indicate the ability to withstand the discomforting spines of the stickleback fish. Reports of American bullfrogs eating scorpions and rattlesnakes also exist.

Analysis of the American bullfrog's realized niche at various sites in Mexico, and comparisons with the niches of endemic frogs show that it is possible that the American bullfrog capable of niche shift, and pose a threat to many endemic Mexican frog species, even those that are not currently in competition with the American bullfrog.

Invasive species 
In areas where the American bullfrog is introduced, the population can be controlled by various means. One project (3n-Bullfrog project) uses sterile triploïd (3n) bullfrogs. In Europe, the American bullfrog is included since 2016 in the list of Invasive Alien Species of Union concern (the Union list). This implies that this species cannot be imported, bred, transported, commercialized, or intentionally released into the environment in the whole of the European Union.

Human use

The American bullfrog provides a food source, especially in the Southern and some areas of the Midwestern United States. The traditional way of hunting them is to paddle or pole silently by canoe or flatboat in ponds or swamps at night; when the frog's call is heard, a light is shone at the frog which temporarily inhibits its movement. The frog will not jump into deeper water as long as it is approached slowly and steadily. When close enough, the frog is gigged with a multiple-tined spear and brought into the boat. Bullfrogs can also be stalked on land, by again taking great care not to startle them. In some states, breaking the skin while catching them is illegal, and either grasping gigs or hand captures used. The only parts normally eaten are the rear legs, which resemble small chicken drumsticks, have a similar flavor and texture and can be cooked in similar ways.

Commercial bullfrog culture in near-natural enclosed ponds has been attempted, but is fraught with difficulties. Although pelleted feed is available, the frogs will not willingly consume artificial diets, and providing sufficient live prey is challenging. Disease also tends to be a problem even when great care is taken to provide sanitary conditions. Other challenges to be overcome may be predation, cannibalism, and low water quality. The frogs are large, have powerful leaps, and inevitably escape after which they may wreak havoc among the native frog population. Countries that export bullfrog legs include the Netherlands, Belgium, Mexico, Bangladesh, Japan, China, Taiwan, and Indonesia. Most of these frogs are caught from the wild, but some are captive-reared. The United States is a net importer of frog legs.

The American bullfrog is used as a specimen for dissection in many schools across the world. It is the state amphibian of Missouri, Ohio, and Oklahoma.

References

External links
 
 
 British Columbia Frog Watch Program: Bull Frog Fact Sheet
 Bullfrog at the Global Invasive Species Database
 Species Profile - Bullfrog (Lithobates catesbeianus), National Invasive Species Information Center, United States National Agricultural Library.

Amphibians of the United States
Amphibians of Canada
Amphibians described in 1802
Fauna of the Eastern United States
Amphibians of the Dominican Republic
Lithobates
Extant Miocene first appearances
Taxa named by George Shaw